The Shahrestan bridge is the oldest bridge on the Zayandeh River in Iran. The foundations date back to the Sasanian era (3rd to 7th century C.E.), but the top was renovated twice, first in the 10th century by the Buyids, then during the 11th century during the Seljuk period. Nevertheless, the architectural style is entirely Sassanian.

The bridge consists of two parabolas. The vertical parabola ensures that the middle of the bridge is its highest point. The horizontal parabola produces a bend to the west, strengthening it against the flow of the river. The bridge is 107.8 metres long and an average of 5.2 metres wide. It has two tiers of pointed arches, thirteen large ones spanning the river itself, and eight smaller ones that nest between them. The purpose of the latter is to quicken the flow of water during floods, taking pressure off the structure. The Zayandeh River has recently been diverted about 100 meters away from the bridge towards the south, leaving an artificial lake around the bridge to protect it from further damage.

Gallery

External links
 Archnet - with photo
 Isfahan.org.uk

See also
 Bridges over the Zayandeh River

References 

Bridges in Iran
Architecture in Iran
Buildings and structures in Isfahan Province
Sasanian architecture
Transportation in Isfahan Province
Bridges in Isfahan